Paul Marcu (also known as Pavel Marcu; 2 June 1939 – 26 March 2004) was a Romanian international footballer who played as a right defender.

International career
He played one game for Romania in 1966 when coach Ilie Oană used him as a starter in a friendly which ended with a 1–0 loss against Portugal played on Estádio do Futebol Clube do Porto.

Honours
Universitatea Cluj
Cupa României: 1964–65

References

External links

Paul Marcu at Labtof.ro

1939 births
2004 deaths
Romanian footballers
Romania international footballers
Association football defenders
ACF Gloria Bistrița players
FC Universitatea Cluj players
Liga I players
Liga III players
Footballers from Bucharest